Michalis Klokidis (born 23 December 1971) is the all-time scorer in the top four divisions of Greek football. He currently plays for Nestos Chrysoupoli in the Kavala FCA League.

Klokidis was a player of Levadeiakos between 1996 and 1998, scoring a total of 29 goals in the Beta Ethniki. He then played for ILTEX Lykoi until January 2000 and then Agersani Naxos. In 2000–01 he played for Leonidio, scoring 21 goals for the Sparta-based team in the Gamma Ethniki, and in the following season he played for Kerkyra and helped his team win that season's Gamma Ethniki with 19 goals. He made 36 appearances and scored 18 goals for Thrasyvoulos during 2003–04 Gamma Ethniki season, and in 2003–04 he played for Rodos where he was the top scorer in the Gamma Ethniki with 29 goals.

In the summer of 2004, he was signed by Asteras Tripolis with whom he celebrated 3 club promotions, once to the third division in 2005, once to the second division in 2006 and finally the club's promotion to the Greek Superleague in 2007. He was the top scorer in the 2004–05 season of Delta Ethniki with 39 goals. Until he left the club in 2007 he managed to score 62 goals for the club and 298 career goals so far.
For 2007–08 he has transferred to Korinthos who is newly promoted to the Gamma Ethniki. He played for Thessaloniki club Makedonikos during the 2008–09 season and for Nestos Chrysoupoli since the 2009–10 season.

References

1971 births
Living people
Greek footballers
Levadiakos F.C. players
ILTEX Lykoi F.C. players
Leonidio F.C. players
A.O. Kerkyra players
Thrasyvoulos F.C. players
Rodos F.C. players
Asteras Tripolis F.C. players
Korinthos F.C. players
Makedonikos F.C. players
Association football forwards
People from Kavala (regional unit)
Footballers from Eastern Macedonia and Thrace